Nyman is an English and Swedish surname. The name originates from Anglo-Saxon culture. The name is derived from the words neowe, niwe, and nige which all mean new, and the word mann, meaning man. The name was traditionally given to newcomers. Other variations of the surname include: Newman, Newmen, and Newmin. People with this surname include:

 Andy Nyman (born 1966), British actor
 Anita Nyman (born 1971), Finnish cross country skier
 Ari Nyman (born 1984), Finnish footballer
 Carl Fredrik Nyman (1820–1893), Swedish botanist
 Carl R. Nyman (1895-1983), American politician
 Chris Nyman (born 1955), American baseball player
 Christina Nyman (1719–1795), Swedish brewer 
 Gustaf Nyman (1874–1952), Finnish sport shooter
 Joni Nyman (born 1962), Finnish boxer, Olympic contestant
 John Nyman (1908–1977), Swedish wrestler
 Lena Nyman (1944-2011), Swedish actress
 Mark Nyman (born 1967), English championship Scrabble player
 Michael Nyman (born 1944), British composer and musicologist
 Molly Nyman British composer, daughter of Michael Nyman
 Nyls Nyman (born 1954), American baseball player
 Peter Nyman (born 1965), Finnish journalist and TV reporter
 Rhonda Nyman American politician
 Robert Nyman American politician 
 Steven Nyman (born 1982), American alpine skier, Olympic contestant

See also
 Naiman (disambiguation)
 Nijman, Dutch surname spelled Nyman abroad

References